The Whakakitenga, formerly known as the Kauhanganui, is a Māori parliament  established by King Tāwhiao of the Kīngitanga in 1889 or 1890. Members of Te Whakakitenga are elected for three year terms, with each marae electing two members.

Background 
Te Kauhanganui was originally established at Maungakawa, located in the present day settlement of Te Miro, near Cambridge. It was founded by Tāwhiao after his proposal to set up a pan-Maori parliament in New Zealand to complement the Colonial legislative council was denied by Auckland authorities. The parliament's members consisted of tribally appointed delegates who advised King Tāwhiao on policy and was used by him to communicate with his subjects.

The Kauhanganui remains in existence today, and currently serves as the governing council of the modern Waikato Tainui tribal government. It is headed by 204 tribal members – 3 members from each of the 68 marae. The marae are spread over a large area from Te Kuiti and Cambridge in the south to Auckland in the north. The executive board is Te Arataura, which has 10 representatives elected from Te Kauhanganui and an 11th member appointed by the Māori king. The Waikato-Tainui tribal administration (or iwi authority) is the "Waikato Raupatu Trustee Company Ltd", which replaced the "Tainui Māori Trust Board", and is situated at Hopuhopu, Ngāruawāhia.

The Waikato-Tainui iwi comprises 33 hapu (sub-tribes) and 65 marae (family groupings). There are over 52,000 tribal members who affiliate to Waikato-Tainui.

See also
Waikato Tainui
Māori King Movement

References

Māori politics